In the Chicago mayoral election of 1845, Democratic nominee Augustus Garrett defeated Whig nominee John H. Kinzie and Liberty nominee Henry Smith by a 7.5% margin.

Garrett had previously served a term as mayor.

All candidates had previously run in Chicago mayoral elections, Garrett in 1842, 1843, and both 1844 elections; Smith in 1842, 1843 and both 1844 elections; Kinzie in 1837.

Results

References

Mayoral elections in Chicago
Chicago
Chicago
1840s in Chicago